Mansoureh Khojaste Bagherzadeh (born 1947) is the wife of Ali Khamenei, the Supreme Leader of Iran.

She was born in a religious family in Mashhad. Her father was Mohammad Esmaeil Khojaste Bagherzadeh, a famous businessman in Mashhad. She is also the sister of Hassan Khojaste Bagherzadeh, former deputy director of IRIB. She first met Ali Khamenei in a private ceremony in 1964. They were married in the following year. Their marriage sermon was read by Ayatollah Mohammad Hadi Milani.

References

1947 births
Living people
People from Mashhad
Ali Khamenei
Wives of Supreme Leaders of Iran
Wives of presidents of Iran